West Point is a town in White County, Arkansas, United States.

David Hamilton was mayor from “1972 except for two years he missed for cancer surgery," according to an article in the Searcy, Arkansas newspaper The Daily Citizen ("Mayors bring politics, leadership to ground level" by Warren Watkins, 27 January 2007). “My great-grandfather landed at West Point in 1865 from a steamboat, and homesteaded  of land by building a log house,” Hamilton said.

Ron Faith has served as mayor since Hamilton's death in 2013.

The same article gives the West Point population as 208.

Incorporated in 1858, West Point marked its sesquicentennial in 2008.  According to local legend, cited by the mayor, the town was in the running with Little Rock to be the site of the state capitol.

Geography
West Point is located along the Little Red River at  (35.205295, -91.611774).

According to the United States Census Bureau, the town has a total area of 1.0 km (0.4 mi2), all land.

Demographics

As of the census of 2000, there were 164 people, 65 households, and 44 families residing in the town. The population density was 158.3/km (411.9/mi2). There were 68 housing units at an average density of 65.6/km (170.8/mi2). The racial makeup of the town was 91.46% White, 3.66% Black or African American, 0.61% Pacific Islander, and 4.27% from two or more races. 6.10% of the population were Hispanic or Latino of any race.

There were 65 households, out of which 32.3% had children under the age of 18 living with them, 52.3% were married couples living together, 15.4% had a female householder with no husband present, and 32.3% were non-families. 26.2% of all households were made up of individuals, and 7.7% had someone living alone who was 65 years of age or older. The average household size was 2.52 and the average family size was 3.14.

In the town, the population was spread out, with 24.4% under the age of 18, 15.2% from 18 to 24, 29.9% from 25 to 44, 16.5% from 45 to 64, and 14.0% who were 65 years of age or older. The median age was 31 years. For every 100 females, there were 95.2 males. For every 100 females age 18 and over, there were 96.8 males.

The median income for a household in the town was $23,125, and the median income for a family was $24,375. Males had a median income of $20,208 versus $23,333 for females. The per capita income for the town was $11,657. About 26.1% of families and 26.1% of the population were below the poverty line, including 42.1% of those under the age of eighteen and 33.3% of those 65 or over.

References

Towns in White County, Arkansas
Towns in Arkansas
Populated places established in 1858
1858 establishments in Arkansas